John Morrison or Morison may refer to:

In politics
 John Morrison (Manitoba politician) (1868–1930), politician in Manitoba, Canada
 John Morrison (Saskatchewan politician) (1872–1950), Canadian Member of Parliament
 John Morrison (intelligence officer) (born 1943), British intelligence officer
 John Morrison (Montana politician) (born 1961), politician in Montana, USA
 John Morison (Canadian politician) (1818–1873), Canadian businessman and political figure
 John Morrison (blacksmith) (1726–1816), farmer, blacksmith and politician in Nova Scotia
 John Morison (Banffshire MP) (c. 1757–1835), British MP for Banffshire
 John Morrison, 1st Baron Margadale (1906–1996), British Conservative Party politician
 John Alexander Morrison (1814–1904), Pennsylvania Congressman
 John Gillis Morrison (1863–1917), politician in Nova Scotia, Canada
 John T. Morrison (1860–1915), Governor of Idaho
 John B. Morison (1923–1996), member of the Canadian House of Commons for Wentworth and Halton—Wentworth
 John Morison Gibson (1842–1929), Canadian politician
 John Morrison, 2nd Viscount Dunrossil (1926–2000), British diplomat
 John Douglas Morrison (1934–2020), Australian police officer and mayor of Waverley

In sports
 Jack Morrison (rugby league) (John Harold Morrison, 1905–1994), Australian rugby league player
 John Morrison (Australian footballer) (born 1947), former Australian rules footballer
 John Morrison (basketball) (born 1945), American professional basketball player and college head coach
 John Morrison (chess player) (1889–1975), Canadian chess player
 John Morrison (cricketer) (born 1947), New Zealand cricketer and Wellington City Councillor
 John Morrison (footballer, born 1889) (1889–1972), Scottish footballer (Falkirk) and manager (Third Lanark, St Mirren)
 John Morrison (footballer, born 1909) (1909–1992), Scottish footballer (Celtic)
 John Morrison (ice hockey, born 1895) (1895–1956), ice hockey player
 John Morrison (ice hockey, born 1945), ice hockey player
 John Morrison (wrestler) (born 1979), ring name for professional wrestler, John Hennigan

In literature
 John L. Morrison (1863–1926), American journalist
 John Sinclair Morrison (1913–2000), British classicist and founder of the Trireme Trust
 John Morrison (writer) (1904–1998), Australian novelist and short story writer

In other fields
 John Morrison (drummer), Australian jazz drummer
 John Morison (bacteriologist) (1879–1971), bacteriophage expert
 John Morison (pastor) (sometimes spelled Morrison, 1791–1859), Congregational minister, London
 John Morrison (priest) (born 1938), Archdeacon of Oxford 
 John G. Morrison (1842–1897), Irish-born navy man during the American Civil War
 John L. Morrison (pioneer) (1819–1899), pioneer to Oregon and namesake of Portland's Morrison Bridge
 John Robert Morrison (1814–1843), British translator, diplomat and missionary in the Far East
 John Stanton Fleming Morrison (1892–1961), British golf course architect
 John Howell Morrison (born 1956), American contemporary classical composer and educator
 John Morrison (songwriter), 19th-century Tyneside songwriter
 John Lowrie Morrison (born 1948), Scottish contemporary artist
 John H. Morrison (born 1933), American lawyer
 John Morrison, puppeteer for Dustin the Turkey
 John Todd Morrison (1863–1944), Scots-born physicist and meteorologist
 John Frank Morrison (1857–1932), American major general
 John B. Morrison, United States Army general

Fictional characters
 Soldier: 76 (Jack Francis Morrison), Overwatch character

See also
 Johnny Morrison (disambiguation)